Lanke may refer to:

 Lanke, manor by Bogensee, Brandenburg, Germany, once owned by Joseph Goebbels
 Lanke Cup, Chinese  Go competition
 Krumme Lanke, a lake near Berlin
 Lanké, a village in the Kara Region of Togo
 Lånke, a former municipality in Stjørdal, Nord-Trøndelag county, Norway
 Ola T. Lånke (born 1948), Norwegian politician
 Lanke (film), a 2021 Indian Kannada-language action drama film